Nargu Wildlife Sanctuary lies on the east side of the Uhl River in Mandi District of Himachal Pradesh. The slopes of the sanctuary are covered with Alpine forest. It is home to various species of animals and birds.

Geography
The sanctuary is located within the geocoordinates: North , East , South , West . The sanctuary falls under the Kullu Forest Division, Kullu district although it is located partially in Mandi district.

Access
Airport:-  Bhuntar (Kullu)
Railway:- The closest Railhead is at Jogindernagar (40 km )
Road:- The sanctuary is well connected by road.

References

External links
himachaltourism.nic.in
hptdc.gov.in

Wildlife sanctuaries in Himachal Pradesh
Mandi district
Geography of Mandi district
Protected areas with year of establishment missing